The College of Public Health and Health Profession is the school of public health and other health professions of the University of Florida.  The college was established by the Florida Board of Regents in 1958 as a separate school within the J. Hillis Miller Health Science Center and is a member of the ASPH and CEPH.  The college's mission is to "preserve, promote, and improve the health and well-being of populations, communities and individuals."  The college grants bachelor's, master's and doctoral degrees.

Research
For fiscal year 2019, the college received over $36 million in total research grants.

National rankings according to US News (2020 edition)

Individual departments 

There are 10 departments within the college:
Behavioral Science and Community Health (BSCH)
Formerly called the College of Rehabilitation Counseling, this college comprises behavioral science and community health. It has two divisions: Rehabilitation Counseling and Social and Behavioral Sciences.
Clinical and Health Psychology  (CHP)
This college comprises clinical psychology and health psychology.
Communicative Disorders (CD)
This college comprises communication disorders.
Epidemiology and Biostatistics (EBS)
This college comprises epidemiology and biostatistics.
Health Science
This college comprises health science.
Health Services Research, Management and Policy
Formerly called the College of Health Services Administration.
Occupational Therapy
This college comprises occupational therapy.
Physical Therapy
This college comprises physical therapy.
Public Health
This college comprises public health.
Rehabilitation Science
This college comprises rehabilitation science.

See also 

 University of Florida College of Dentistry
 University of Florida College of Medicine
 University of Florida College of Nursing
 University of Florida College of Pharmacy
 University of Florida College of Veterinary Medicine

References

External links 
Official website

Public Health and Health Professions
Schools of public health in the United States
Educational institutions established in 1958
1958 establishments in Florida
Medical and health organizations based in Florida